KVSF (1400 AM) is a radio station licensed to Santa Fe, New Mexico, United States. The station serves the Santa Fe area and is currently owned by Hutton Broadcasting, LLC (a New Mexico, LLC). It carries a sports format.  Its studios and transmitter are located in Santa Fe.

Hutton Broadcasting had a construction permit to move translator K291BC from Truth or Consequences to Santa Fe to broadcast this station on the FM band at 97.7. The translator was licensed as K249FB effective February 21, 2018, and then moved to 93.7 FM as K229DU effective October 12, 2021.

References

External links

Sports radio stations in the United States
VSF